The name Háma may refer to:

Háma, a hero in Anglo-Saxon and Norse mythology
Háma (Middle-earth), two character in J. R. R. Tolkien's The Lord of the Rings; the first the son of Helm Hammerhand, the second the Doorward of king Theoden.

See also
 Hama (disambiguation)